Claude Williams may refer to:

Candy Williams (Claude Williams, 1929–1983), Aboriginal Australian musician, actor, and activist, father of basketball player Claude Williams
Claude Williams (basketball, born 1952), Aboriginal Australian basketball coach
Claude Williams (basketball, born 1965), American basketball player
Claude Williams (musician) (1908–2004), American jazz musician 
Claude Williams (politician) (born 1955), Canadian politician
Claude A. Williams, Adjutant General of Virginia, United States
Claude C. Williams (1895–1979), American Presbyterian minister and civil rights/labor activist
Lefty Williams (Claude Preston Williams, 1893–1959), American Major League Baseball player

See also
Claude Williamson, American jazz pianist